Johnnie Charley Finner (born August 7, 1885) was an American Negro league pitcher between 1919 and 1925.

Finner made his Negro leagues debut in 1919 with the St. Louis Giants. He remained with the club (later known as the "Stars") through 1924. Finner also spent time with the Milwaukee Bears, and finished his career in 1925 with the Birmingham Black Barons.

References

External links
 and Baseball-Reference Black Baseball stats and Seamheads

1885 births
20th-century deaths
Year of death missing
Place of birth missing
Place of death missing
Birmingham Black Barons players
Milwaukee Bears players
St. Louis Giants players
St. Louis Giants (1924) players
St. Louis Stars (baseball) players
Baseball pitchers
20th-century African-American people